The 2011 BH Tennis Open International Cup was a professional tennis tournament played on clay courts. It was the 20th edition of the tournament which was part of the 2011 ATP Challenger Tour. It took place in Belo Horizonte, Brazil between 12 and 18 September 2011.

ATP entrants

Seeds

 1 Rankings are as of August 29, 2011.

Other entrants
The following players received wildcards into the singles main draw:
  Richard Arlindo
  Gabriel Dias
  Thiago Moura Monteiro
  Márcio Torres

The following players received entry from the qualifying draw:
  Fabiano de Paula
  Martín Cuevas
  Kevin Konfederak
  Carlos Oliveira

Champions

Singles

 Júlio Silva def.  Gastão Elias, 6–4, 6–4

Doubles

 Guido Andreozzi /  Eduardo Schwank def.  Ricardo Hocevar /  Christian Lindell, 6–2, 6–4

External links
Official Website
ITF Search
ATP official site

BH Tennis Open International Cup
BH Tennis Open International Cup